Sapanca can refer to:

 Sapanca
 Sapanca, Ayvacık
 Sapanca, Sur
 Sapanca railway station